Isobel "Izzy" Meikle-Small (born 22 March 1996) is a British actress who has appeared in various feature films and TV shows.

Career
Meikle-Small is best known for portraying young Kathy H. in the 2010 film Never Let Me Go. She played the younger version of the actress Carey Mulligan, to whom she has a close resemblance. In December 2011, Meikle-Small was also in the BBC miniseries Great Expectations (2011) where she played young Estella and Vanessa Kirby played the older Estella. During this role she also studied for her GCSEs at Brighton College and achieved 9 A*s. She appeared in the 2012 film Private Peaceful as young Molly and young Ravenna in the 2012 fantasy film Snow White and the Huntsman.

In July 2014, Meikle-Small played Molly in Pudsey the Dog: The Movie.

Filmography

References

External links
 

1996 births
Actresses from Sussex
Living people
English child actresses
English film actresses
English television actresses
21st-century English actresses
People from Hove